Kyle Prandi (born June 19, 1979 in Cleveland, Ohio) is an American diver and Olympian from Strongsville, Ohio. Kyle represented the United States in the 2004 Summer Olympics, earning 29th place in men's 10-meter diving platform with 346.53 points, and placing 8th in men's 10-meter synchronized platform with diving partner Mark Ruiz. Prandi holds the American record for the highest recorded score on a single dive (104.76 on a 207B at the 2002 World Cup Trials).

Results 
 1998 Cinergy/PSI National Diving Championships – Gold Medal in Platform Synchro
 2002 World Cup Trials – Gold Medal in 10 m Platform
 2004 Speedo American Cup – Gold Medal in Platform Synchro

See also 
 United States at the 2004 Summer Olympics

References 

1979 births
American male divers
Divers at the 2003 Pan American Games
Divers at the 2004 Summer Olympics
Living people
Olympic divers of the United States
Pan American Games bronze medalists for the United States
Pan American Games medalists in diving
People from Strongsville, Ohio
Sportspeople from Cleveland
Medalists at the 2003 Pan American Games